Vadim Yakunin is a Russian businessman and billionaire.

Career 
After beginning in the Hungarian tourism sector, Yakunin founded the Rigla pharmacy chain, and later the PROTEK distribution firm.

Net worth 
As of August 2022, Yakunin is worth $1.5 billion, according to Forbes.

Personal life 
Yakunin is married and has three children. He resides in Moscow and graduated from Moscow Institute of Physics and Technology.

References

Russian billionaires
Year of birth missing (living people)
Living people